Kamran Farid is an entrepreneur, inventor, and philanthropist. He is the co-founder of Edible Arrangements, a U.S. based franchising business that specializes in fresh fruit arrangements, melding the concept of fruit baskets with designs inspired by the floral business. He is also the founder of the Kamran Farid Foundation, K Capital Group, and BerryDirect. He currently serves on the Edible Arrangements® Board of Directors, and the Board at Southern Connecticut State University's School of Business.

Early life 
He was born in Sahiwal, Pakistan before his family emigrated to the United States of America. He has five siblings from his parents Ghulam and Salma Farid most notable among them, Tariq Farid, with whom he co-founded Edible Arrangements with. His family moved from Pakistan to the United States. His father had to work three jobs to make ends meet for his wife and six children. Challenges increased when he was diagnosed with Leukemia but he was lucky to receive the best health care and was saved.

Entrepreneurship 
After designing the computers, training manuals and production and profitability tracking they decided to franchise the concept and since then it has grown to more than 1200+ stores. Edible Arrangements was ranked among the Top 40 by Entrepreneur Magazine in 2013. This is because it had been one of the fastest-growing franchises in the US for five consecutive years. It was also named among the Top 100 Internet Retailers in 2015 by the Internet Retailer Magazine.

Philanthropy 
Kamran Farid has set up a foundation "Kamran Farid Foundation" that has made a number of donations. He has also donated to a meal program in Branford.

References 

Living people
American inventors
American people of Pakistani descent
American philanthropists
Pakistani businesspeople
Year of birth missing (living people)